The National Association of Local Authorities of Georgia was set up in 2003 by the Congress of Local and Regional Authorities of the Council of Europe under the instruction of the Council of Europe and the European Commission in order to carry out a new joint activity for setting up a national association of local authorities in Georgia.

Sources 
Council of Europe Page on the National Association of Local Authorities of Georgia

Council of Europe
Congress of the Council of Europe
Government agencies of Georgia (country)